Keshab Chandra Pradhan (October 1948) also known as K.C. Pradhan is an Indian forester, politician and bureaucrat. He was the Chief Secretary of Sikkim, member of State Couuncil and President of Sikkim Janata Congress in erstwhile Kingdom of Sikkim.

References

Sikkim politicians
1948 births